FK Pobeda AD Prilep is a football club based in the city of Prilep, North Macedonia. They are currently competing in the Macedonian First League.

History 
The club was founded in 2010 as Viktorija (eventually renaming to Pobeda Junior) after the FK Pobeda was banned by FIFA for eight years. Legally, the two clubs' track records and honors are kept separate by the Football Federation of Macedonia.

In 2015, Pobeda Junior was renamed to match the name of the old club that was suspended, Pobeda.

The club was promoted to the Macedonian First League for the first time after finishing 1st in the 2015–16 Macedonian Second League. The club managed to stay in the First League for 3 seasons until it was relegated in the 2018-19 Macedonian First League, finishing in 10th.

Pobeda eventually returned to the First League after winning the Eastern group of the 2021–22 Macedonian Second League.

Honours

 Macedonian Second League:
Winners (2): 2015–16, 2021–22

Recent seasons

1The 2019–20 season was abandoned due to the COVID-19 pandemic in North Macedonia.

Current squad
As of 15 January 2023.

Historical list of coaches

 Jane Nikolovski (2014)
 Darko Krsteski (Jul 2015 – Sep 2016)
 Zoran Shterjovski (Sep 2016 – Sep 2017)
 Slavoljub Bubanja (Sep 2017 – Mar 2018)
 Slobodan Krčmarević (Mar 2018 - Apr 2018)
 Toni Meglenski (Apr 2018 – Nov 2018)
 Jane Nikolovski (Nov 2018 - Mar 2019)
 Toni Meglenski (Mar 2019 - Jun 2019)
 Darko Krsteski (Jan 2020 - Dec 2021)
 Dimitar Kapinkovski (Jan 2022 - Jun 2022)
 Boban Babunski (Jul 2022 - Jan 2023)
 Blagojce Damevski (Jan 2023 - )

References

External links
Official website  
Official Facebook page 
Supporters Website 
Club info at MacedonianFootball 
Football Federation of Macedonia 

Association football clubs established in 2010
2010 establishments in the Republic of Macedonia
Football clubs in Prilep